The Morphy number is a measure of how closely a chess player is connected to Paul Morphy (1837–1884) by way of playing chess games.

Description

People who played a chess game with Morphy have a Morphy number of 1. Players who did not play Morphy but played someone with a Morphy number of 1 have a Morphy number of 2. People who played someone with a Morphy number of 2 have a Morphy number of 3, et cetera.

, there are very few known living players with Morphy number 3. Many ordinary players have a Morphy number of 6 or more.

The idea is similar to the Erdős number for mathematicians, the Bacon number for actors, and the Shusaku number, the equivalent for the board game of Go.

Origin
Taylor Kingston states that the idea of the Morphy number may have originated in a June 2000 note by Tim Krabbé, who has Morphy number 4. Krabbé wrote "I once played an official game with Euwe, who played Tarrasch, who played Paulsen, who played Morphy."

Morphy number of famous players
These are players who are important in making links for Morphy numbers.

Morphy number 1
Morphy is known to have played about 100 people, but all of the known links for players with Morphy number 2 go through the following five players. 

A few years after the early lists of Morphy numbers tabulated, it was discovered that a fifth player, James Mortimer, was Morphy's friend and he played casual games with him. This gives Mortimer a Morphy number of 1, creating a need to drastically revise those previous lists to include many more players. This is because Mortimer had a very long, if not particularly successful, career, including the Ostende-B 1907 tournament. This enabled many famous younger players to gain a Morphy number of 2, including Mieses, Tartakower, Znosko-Borovsky, and Bernstein, who played beyond WW2, enabling still younger players to gain a Morphy number of 3, and so on. 

Adolf Anderssen
Henry Bird
James Mortimer

John Owen
Louis Paulsen
Other opponents

Morphy number 2
Everyone in this group played someone in the group above. The Australian champion Frederick Esling achieved MN2 by beating Anderssen in an offhand game and another Australian champion, Julius Leigh Jacobsen (1862–1916) achieved MN2 by beating Bird in a casual match +4-2=1, enabling many Australian players of the early 20th century to achieve MN3.
The following are some of the most important players who have achieved MN2.  

Semyon Alapin
Ossip Bernstein
Joseph Blackburne
Amos Burn
Mikhail Chigorin
Eugene Ernest Colman
Oldřich Duras
Frederick Esling
Isidor Gunsberg
David Janowski
Emanuel Lasker

S. Lipschütz
George Mackenzie
Frank Marshall
James Mason
Jacques Mieses
Géza Maróczy
Reginald Michell
Aron Nimzowitsch
Harry Pillsbury
Akiba Rubinstein
Carl Schlechter

Edward Guthlac Sergeant
Jackson Showalter
Rudolf Spielmann
Wilhelm Steinitz
Siegbert Tarrasch
Savielly Tartakower
Richard Teichmann
Sir George Thomas
Szymon Winawer
Eugene Znosko-Borovsky
Johannes Zukertort

Morphy number 3
Most of the masters in this group played several members of the previous group. This group includes some of the most important players for making connections to later generations. Botvinnik and Reshevsky played older masters such as Lasker and Janowski, had long careers, and played many younger players. Najdorf was Tartakower's pupil and they played a number of published games together, and Najdorf played blitz right into his 80s, allowing many younger players to achieve 4. Smyslov and Keres had very long careers, so much younger players achieved MN4 by playing them. Gligoric also played Tartakover, allowing many Yugoslav players to achieve 4. C.J.S. Purdy played Tartakower, enabling many Australian players to achieve 4. Fairhurst, who played Tartakover, was many times champion of Scotland, and later moved to New Zealand, so a number of players in these countries achieved 4 by playing him.

As of May 2022, living players with Morphy number 3 are Leonard Barden, Bernard Cafferty, Franciscus Kuijpers, Christian Langeweg, Aleksandar Matanović, Friðrik Ólafsson, Oliver Penrose, and Stewart Reuben.

James Macrae Aitken
Alexander Alekhine
Conel Hugh O'Donel Alexander
Leonard Barden
Pal Benko
Arthur Bisguier
Efim Bogolyubov
Fedor Bogatyrchuk
Isaac Boleslavsky
Mikhail Botvinnik
David Bronstein
Bernard Cafferty
José Raúl Capablanca
Martin Christoffel
Arthur Dake
Arnold Denker
Jan Hein Donner
Marcel Duchamp
Erich Eliskases

Max Euwe
William Fairhurst
Reuben Fine
Salo Flohr
Svetozar Gligorić
Borislav Ivkov
Paul Keres
George Koltanowski
Alexander Kotov
Čeněk Kottnauer
Franciscus Kuijpers
Christian Langeweg
Bent Larsen
Edward Lasker
Andor Lilienthal
Aleksandar Matanović
Vera Menchik
Stuart Milner-Barry
Vladimir Nabokov
Miguel Najdorf

Friðrik Ólafsson
Frank Parr
Jonathan Penrose
Oliver Penrose
Arturo Pomar
Lodewijk Prins
David Pritchard
C.J.S. Purdy
Samuel Reshevsky
Stewart Reuben
Friedrich Sämisch
Vasily Smyslov
Rudolf Spielmann
Herman Steiner
László Szabó
Wolfgang Unzicker
Milan Vidmar
Robert Wade
Norman Whitaker
Baruch Harold Wood

Morphy number 4
 many of these players are still alive; a few (such as Anand and Short) are still active.

Michael Adams
Viswanathan Anand
Ulf Andersson
Lev Aptekar
Keith Arkell
Yuri Averbakh
Alexander Beliavsky
Harold Bloom
Walter Browne
Donald Byrne
Murray Chandler
Maia Chiburdanidze
Nigel Davies
Mark Dvoretsky
Ben Finegold
Bobby Fischer
Semyon Furman
Nona Gaprindashvili
Paul Garbett
Efim Geller
Florin Gheorghiu
Ewen Green

Vlastimil Hort
Robert Hübner
Vassily Ivanchuk
Gata Kamsky
Anatoly Karpov
Garry Kasparov
Allen Kaufman
Alexander Khalifman
Ratmir Kholmov
Viktor Korchnoi
Gary Lane
Ljubomir Ljubojević
Sergio Mariotti
Tony Miles
Predrag Nikolić
John Nunn
Bruce Pandolfini
Tigran Petrosian
Judit Polgár
Susan Polgar
Ruslan Ponomariov
Lajos Portisch

Lev Polugaevsky
Hans Ree
Zoltán Ribli
Ian Rogers
Valery Salov
Ortvin Sarapu
Jonathan Sarfati
Yasser Seirawan
Alexei Shirov
Nigel Short
Vernon Small
Boris Spassky
Peter Svidler
Richard John Sutton
Mark Taimanov
Mikhail Tal
Jan Timman
Veselin Topalov
Anna Ushenina
Rafael Vaganian
John L. Watson

Morphy number 5
, many of the top grandmasters were thought to be in this group (along with a large number of lower-rated players). However, several players initially thought to be in this group were actually MN4s; for instance, based on playing Smyslov, who played Tartakower and Bernstein.

Magnus Carlsen
Boris Gelfand
Mikhail Gurevich
Igor Ivanov

Rustam Kasimdzhanov
Vladimir Kramnik
Joël Lautier
Péter Lékó

Karsten Müller
Jon Speelman
Artur Yusupov

See also 

 List of chess players

References

External links
 Chessgames.com

Chess terminology
Separation numbers